Amahlongwa Mission or simply known as Amahlongwa and oftely informally abbreviated as A.M.H is a small township on the south coast region of KwaZulu-Natal.

Demography
The population of the township in 2011 was 7,455 people with 1,591 households. It also has an area of 12.10 kilometer squared, with an elevation of 554m above sea level.

Religion
Churches in the area include : 
 Apostolic Faith Mission of South Africa
 Assemblies of God
 Roman Catholic Church
 Zion Christian Church

Geography

Location
It is under the Umdoni Local Municipality, with neighboring townships such as Amandawe, Dududu, KwaCele, Clausthal.

Wildlife
The township has a large number of animals such as Black mambas, brown house snake, Spotted bush snake, etc.

Notable people
 Sandile Ngidi - A poet, journalist

References

Populated places in the Umdoni Local Municipality